Scincella victoriana is a species of skink found in Myanmar.

References

Scincella
Reptiles of Myanmar
Reptiles described in 1940
Taxa named by Benjamin Shreve